Pero is a genus of moths in the family Geometridae erected by Gottlieb August Wilhelm Herrich-Schäffer in 1855.

Species
In alphabetical order:
Pero aeniasaria (Walker, 1860)
Pero ancetaria (Hübner, 1806)
Pero astapa (Druce, 1892)
Pero behrensaria (Packard, 1871)
Pero catalina Poole, 1987
Pero flavisaria (Grossbeck, 1906)
Pero gigantea (Grossbeck, 1910)
Pero hoedularia (Guenée, 1857)
Pero honestaria (Walker, 1860)
Pero hubneraria (Guenée, 1857)
Pero inviolata (Hulst, 1898)
Pero macdunnoughi (Cassino & Swett, 1922)
Pero meskaria (Packard, 1876)
Pero mizon (Rindge, 1955)
Pero modesta (Grossbeck, 1910)
Pero modestus Grossbeck, 1910
Pero morrisonaria (H. Edwards, 1881)
Pero muzoides Herbulot, 2002
Pero nerisaria (Walker, 1860)
?Pero obfuscata (Warren, 1894)
Pero occidentalis (Hulst, 1896)
Pero pima Poole, 1987
Pero polygonaria (Herrich-Schäffer, [1855])
Pero radiosaria (Hulst, 1886)
Pero rectisectaria (Herrich-Schäffer, [1855])
Pero spongiata (Guenée, 1857)
Pero zalissaria (Walker, 1860)

References

Azelinini
Geometridae genera